Cooks Brook may refer to:

in Canada
 Cooks Brook, Nova Scotia
 Cooks Brook (Newfoundland), a stream

in the United States
Cooks Brook, of Cooks Brook Beach, Barnstable County, Massachusetts